Wallace is the name of two unincorporated communities in the State of Michigan:
Wallace, Menominee County, Michigan
Wallace, Alcona County, Michigan